Anti-fungal means to kill or to prevent growth of fungi, and may refer to:
 Antifungal medication, used to treat or prevent fungal infections
 Fungicide, an anti-fungal substance that kills fungi
 Fungistatics, anti-fungal substances that prevent fungi from growing or reproducing

See also
 Antifungal protein family